Carex paleacea, the chaffy sedge, is one of the 579 species of Carex. The Wetland Indicator Status for the species is classified as "obligate wetland" (OBL), occurring 99% of the time in a typical salt marsh environment when conditions are favorable.

References

paleacea
Flora of Eastern Canada
Flora of the Northeastern United States
Plants described in 1803
Flora without expected TNC conservation status